Stefano Mazzocco (born April 13, 1980 in Arzignano) is an Italian professional football player currently playing for A.C. Pavia.

He played 2 seasons (3 games) in the Serie A for Vicenza Calcio.

Honours
 Coppa Italia winner: 1996/97.

External links
 

1980 births
Living people
Italian footballers
Serie A players
L.R. Vicenza players
A.C. Reggiana 1919 players
A.S. Cittadella players
Calcio Padova players
A.C. Monza players
F.C. Pavia players
Association football midfielders
People from Arzignano
Real Vicenza V.S. players
Sportspeople from the Province of Vicenza
Footballers from Veneto